Mutatocoptops cambodgensis is a species of beetle in the family Cerambycidae. It was described by Stephan von Breuning in 1974. It is known from Cambodia.

References

Mesosini
Beetles described in 1974